Justice Oliphant may refer to:

A. Dayton Oliphant, associate justice of the New Jersey Supreme Court
Ethelbert Patterson Oliphant, associate justice of the Supreme Court of Washington Territory